Ólafsfjarðarvöllur is a multi-use stadium in Ólafsfjörður, Iceland. It is currently used mostly for football matches and is the home stadium of Knattspyrnufélag Fjarðabyggðar. Its capacity is around 2100.

References

Football venues in Iceland